Atlantiques is a 2009 Franco-Senegalese documentary short film directed by Mati Diop and co-produced by Corinne Castel and Frederic Papon. The film starring Alpha Diop, Cheikh M'Baye, Ouli Seck and Serigne Seck. The film deals with the odyssey of three Senegalese friends attempting a life-threatening boat crossing, which is a form of illegal migration.

The film has been shot in Dakar, Senegal. The film made its premier on 1 April 2011 in the United States. The film received mixed reviews from critics. At the Cinéma du Réel 2010, the film won the Louis Marcorelles Award - Mention. Then in the same year, the film won the Tiger Award for Short Film at the Rotterdam International Film Festival.

Cast
 Alpha Diop
 Cheikh M'Baye
 Ouli Seck
 Serigne Seck

References

External links 
 

2009 films
Senegalese short documentary films
French short documentary films
2000s French films